Michel Jonasz (born 21 January 1947 in Drancy, France) is a French composer-songwriter, singer and actor. His compositions include: La boîte de jazz, Joueurs de blues and Les vacances au bord de la mer.

Born of Hungarian immigrant parents, Michel Jonasz left school at the age of 15 to find his way in the arts. Painting, theatre and music interested him, but he began his artistic career as a pianist. After working with both Vigon and The Lemons, in 1966 he created the band King Set with his friend, the guitarist Alain Goldstein.

Two radio successes made his voice and his talent for rhythm known: an original composition, Apesanteur (Weightlessness), in 1967, and Jezebel in 1968.

His solo career began slowly with a single ("45t") at the end of 1968 under the name of Michel Kingset, the next in 1970 under his own name. He had to wait until 1974 to find a large audience with two simultaneous hits ("tubes"): Dites-Moi and Super Nana.

Discography

Albums 

 1974 : 
 1975 : 
 1977 : 
 1978 : 
 1979 : 
 1981 : 
 1983 : 
 1985 : 
 1988 : 
 1992 : 
 1996 : 
 2000 : 
 2002 : 
 2005 : 
 2007 : Chanson française
 2011 : Les Hommes sont toujours des enfants
 2019 : La Méouge, le Rhône, La Durance
 2023 : Chanter le Blues

Filmography

Film 

 1979 :  directed by Jean-Michel Ribes
 1981 :  directed by Élie Chouraqui
 1984 :  directed by 
 1988 :  directed by 
 1999 :  directed by 
 1999 : Une pour toutes directed by Claude Lelouch
 2001 : Lisa directed by 
 2003 :  directed by Sam Garbarski
 2004 : Mariage avec mon fils directed by Pierre Berecz
 2004 :  directed by 
 2006 : La maison de Nina directed by Richard Dembo
 2007 :  directed by 
 2008 : Les Hauts Murs directed by Christian Faure
 2008 :  directed by Lucien Jean-Baptiste
 2013 :  directed by 
 2013 : Un excellent dossier ! directed by Artus de Penguern
 2014 :  directed by 
 2016 : Dieumerci ! directed by Lucien Jean-Baptiste
 2017 : Il a déjà tes yeux directed by Lucien Jean-Baptiste
 2017 :  directed by 
 2017 :  directed by Lucien Jean-Baptiste
 2018 :  directed by Ludovic Bernard
 2019 :  directed by Mélanie Auffret
 2020 :  directed by 
 2020 : Vagabondes directed by Philippe Dajoux

Television 
 2005 : Dalida directed by Joyce Buñuel

External links 
 Official Michel Jonasz Site (in French)
 

1947 births
Living people
French people of Hungarian-Jewish descent
French male singers
French singer-songwriters
French male singer-songwriters